"Reconsider Me" is a country/soul ballad written by Margaret Lewis and Mira Smith.

Johnny Adams recording
Johnny Adams's 1969 version was his biggest hit, peaking at number eight on the American R&B charts and number 28 on the pop charts.

Narvel Felts recording
The highest-charting version is by American country music artist Narvel Felts. Released in 1975, it was the first single from his album Narvel Felts. The song peaked at number two on the Billboard Hot Country Singles chart and number 67 on the Billboard Hot 100. It also reached number one on the RPM Country Tracks chart in Canada.

Other recordings
In 1969, Ray Pillow's country version hit number 38 on the country charts.
The song was the title track of a 1971 album, Reconsider Me, by John Wesley Ryles, and as a single it hit number 39 on the country charts.
In 2009, Louisiana bluesman Bryan Lee covered the song on his album My Lady Don't Love My Lady.
Jimmy Barnes covered the song on his 2009 album The Rhythm and the Blues.
In 2013, Dayna Kurtz covered the song on her album Secret Canon Vol. 2.

Chart performance

Johnny Adams

Ray Pillow

John Wesley Ryles I

Narvel Felts

References

1969 singles
1971 singles
1975 singles
Johnny Adams songs
Ray Pillow songs
John Wesley Ryles songs
Narvel Felts songs
Songs written by Margaret Lewis (singer-songwriter)
1969 songs
Dot Records singles
Songs written by Mira Ann Smith